Gastor may refer to:
El Gastor, a city in Cádiz Province, Spain
MV Gastor, an LNG carrier built by Chantiers de l'Atlantique
Global Automotive Summit Toronto, a yearly event for the Automotive software industry

People with the surname
Diego del Gastor (1908–1973), Spanish flamenco guitarist

See also
Castor (disambiguation)
Kastor (disambiguation)
Gastro-, common English-language prefix derived from the ancient Greek γαστήρ gastēr ("stomach")